The Decree on Separation of Church from State and School from Church is a legal act adopted by the Council of People's Commissars of the Russian Soviet Federative Socialist Republic on January 20 (February 2), 1918 came into force on January 23 (February 5) of the same year, on the day of official publication. It installed the secular nature of the state power, proclaimed the freedom of conscience and religion; religious organizations were deprived of any property rights and the rights of a legal entity. It laid the foundation for the deployment of atheistic propaganda and atheistic education.

The Decree was superseded by the a law of the Supreme Soviet of the RSFSR in 25 October 1990, and further superseded in the Russian Federation in 1997.

Contents 
The short edict is composed of 13 diktats regarding religion's role within Soviet sociocultural and political spaces. The edict was first published in Sobranie Uzakonenii i Rasporiazhenii Rabochego i Krestianskogo Pravitelstva (Collection of Legislation and Orders of the Workers 'and Peasants' Government) in 1918 and solidified that Soviet Russia was to be a non-religious or secular society. Further, while religious observation was technically allowed (No.3), those practicing could not threaten the public and "disturb the public order" (No.5) by showing their religious affiliations. 

Religious Institutions themselves had their social influence retracted, religious teachings in public and private classrooms now banned (No.9) and were now responsible for their own well-being, no longer being financially supported nor institutionally protected by local or state government (No.10). No. 12 and 13 denounced religious bodies from any type of land or property ownership in accordance with Soviet law at the time, while No. 4 through 8 further separated religious worship from official and public spaces, while also consolidating civic authority. No. 2 forbade state-sanctioned, special treatment of persons or Institutions based on religious affiliation, such a relationship called "Symphonia" or "Caesaropapism" and prior to the Soviet secularization campaigns, served as the premiere model for Church-State relations for Orthodox Russia.

The decree was created by a special commission which included: People's Commissar of Justice Pyotr Stucka, the People's Commissar of Education, Anatoly Lunacharsky, a member of the board of the People's Commissariat of Justice Pyotr Krasikov, Mikhail Reisner who was a well-known lawyer and professor of law at St. Petersburg University and a former Orthodox priest turned atheist, Mikhail Galkin.

The edict was signed by Vladimir Lenin under his real last name Ulyanov who acted as Chairman of Sovnarkom, or The Council of People's Commissar. His signature is joined by eight others: N. Podvoisky, V. Algasov, V. Trutovsky, A. Schlichter, P. Proshian, V. Menzhinsky, A. Shlyapnikov, G. Petrovsky and the manager of the affairs of the Council of People's Commissars V. Bonch-Bruyevich.

References

Literature 
 Dobronovskaya А. P. Отделение церкви от государства в Енисейской губернии (1920—1922 гг.) // Сибирь в XVII—XX веках: Проблемы политической и социальной истории: Бахрушинские чтения 1999—2000 гг.: межвуз. сб. науч. тр. / под ред. В. И. Шишкина. — Новосибирск: Новосибирский государственный университет, 2002.
 Rassylnikov I.A. Принцип «отделения школы от церкви» как необходимый признак светского государства и его значение в условиях правовой реформы // Правовые реформы в России. — Ростов-на-Дону: Изд-во СКАГС, 2004. — С. 124—129.

External links 
 Decree on Separation of Church and State at the Marxists Internet Archive
 ДЕКРЕТ ОБ ОТДЕЛЕНИИ ЦЕРКВИ ОТ ГОСУДАРСТВА // Древо. Открытая православная энциклопедия
 Elizabeth Sewell. Comparative characteristics of the secular state and equality of religious organizations

Atheism
Religion in Russia
Anti-religious campaign in the Soviet Union
Soviet decrees
Secularism